Abdallah ibn al-Musayyab ibn Zuhayr al-Dabbi was a governor of Egypt for the Abbasid Caliphate, from 792 to 793.

Career
He was a son of al-Musayyab ibn Zuhayr, a participant of the Abbasid Revolution who later served as a provincial governor and security chief. In 792 he was appointed as governor (wali) of Egypt by the caliph Harun al-Rashid, as a replacement for the deceased Ibrahim ibn Salih. During his governorship he is reported to have been engaged in hostilities with the people of the Hawf district, and to have received a request from the emir of Córdoba Hashim I for reinforcements in support of his raids against the Franks. After remaining in office for a little under a year, he was dismissed and replaced with Ishaq ibn Sulayman al-Hashimi. 

In 795 Abdallah was again put in charge of affairs in Egypt, this time as resident deputy (khalifah) for the absentee governor Abd al-Malik ibn Salih, and he stayed in that position until Abd al-Malik's successor Ubaydallah ibn al-Mahdi arrived to replace him in the middle of that year.  

According to Ibn Qutaybah, he was also a governor of Fars and the Jazirah.

Notes

References
 
 
 
 
 
 

Abbasid governors of Egypt
8th-century Abbasid governors of Egypt
8th-century Arabs